PSLV-C4 was the fourth operational launch and overall seventh mission of the PSLV program. This launch was also the forty-eight launch by Indian Space Research Organisation since its first mission on 1 January 1962. The vehicle carried and injected India's first dedicated Meteorological satellite, Kalpana-1 (originally called MetSat) into the Geosynchronous transfer orbit. PSLV-C4 was launched at 15:53 hours IST on 12 September 2002 from Satish Dhawan Space Centre  (then called "Sriharikota Launching Range").

Mission highlights
Fourth operational launch of the PSLV program.
Overall seventh mission of the PSLV program.
First Indian spaceflight to inject a satellite in the Geosynchronous transfer orbit.
PSLV-C4 carried and injected India's first dedicated Meteorological satellite, Kalpana-1.

Mission parameters
 Mass:
 Total liftoff weight: 
 Payload weight: 
 Overall height: 
 Propellant:
 First stage: Solid HTPB based (138.0 + 54 tonnes)
 Second stage: Liquid UDMH +  (40.6 tonnes)
 Third stage: Solid HTPB based (7.6 tonnes)
 Fourth stage: Liquid MMH + MON (2.5 tonnes)
 Engine:
 First stage: S139
 Second stage: Vikas
 Third stage: 
 Fourth stage: 2 x PS-4
 Thrust:
 First stage: 4,628 + 662 x 6 kN
 Second stage: 725 kN
 Third stage: 260 kN
 Fourth stage: 7.4 x 2 kN
 Duration: 1,211 seconds

Payload
PSLV-C4 carried and deployed India's first dedicated Meteorological satellite, Kalpana-1 into the Geosynchronous transfer orbit.

See also
 Indian Space Research Organisation
 Polar Satellite Launch Vehicle

References 

Spacecraft launched in 2002
Polar Satellite Launch Vehicle